Euphrasia micrantha is a species of flowering plant belonging to the family Orobanchaceae.

Its native range is Europe.

Synonym:
 Euphrasia glabrescens (Wettst.) Wiinst.

References

micrantha
Taxa named by Ludwig Reichenbach